Tomoko Igata (井形とも子, born October 30, 1965) is a Japanese former professional Grand Prix motorcycle road racer. She competed in the Grand Prix world championships from 1992 to 1995. Igata is notable for being the second full-time female rider after Taru Rinne, to compete in Grand Prix motorcycle racing history. In 2016, Igata was named an FIM Legend for her pioneering Grand Prix racing career.

Motorcycle racing career
Igata competed in the 125cc All Japan Road Race Championship from 1991 to 1993, finishing in the Top 10 every year. Her best result was in 199q when she finished 6th in the Championship. In 1992 Igata made her Grand Prix debut at Suzuka as a wild card where she survived the treacherous wet track finishing 20th and capturing the attention of the media.

In 1994 she signed up for a full 125cc World Championship with the FCC Technical Sports team racing a Honda RS125. Igata immediately won two points at the first race in Australia and rode an impressive race in Suzuka, but was injured in a crash at the Austrian Grand Prix and was replaced by her teammate in Japanese championship Tomomi Manako. She returned towards the end of season to finish 28th in the Championship. 

Igata again competed in the 1995 season and achieved a best place finish of 7th at the Czech Grand Prix after having also occupied the 5th place during the race; the highest placing for a female in the history of the Championship. She ended the season in 20th. 

Igata subsequently returned to Japanese racing in the 125cc class but without major success.

References

125cc World Championship riders
Japanese motorcycle racers
Living people
Female motorcycle racers
1965 births